The 2017 Harvard Crimson football team represented Harvard University during the 2017 NCAA Division I FCS football season. They were led by 24th-year head coach Tim Murphy and played their home games at Harvard Stadium. They were a member of the Ivy League. They finished the season 5–5 overall and 3–4 in Ivy League play to tie for fifth place. Harvard averaged 10,411 fans per game.

Schedule
The 2017 schedule consisted of five home games and five away games. The Crimson hosted Ivy League foes Brown, Princeton, Dartmouth, and Penn, and traveled to Cornell, Columbia, and Yale for the 134th edition of The Game.

Harvard's non-conference opponents were Rhode Island of the Colonial Athletic Association, and Georgetown and Lafayette of the Patriot League.

Game summaries

Rhode Island

Brown

Georgetown

Cornell

Lafayette

Princeton

Dartmouth

Columbia

Penn

Yale ("The Game")

References

Harvard
Harvard Crimson football seasons
Harvard Crimson football
Harvard Crimson football